Marianne Pitzen (born 29 May 1948), GER, is a German artist born in Stuttgart. In 1981, Pitzen founded the Bonn Women's Museum, of which she is the current director. The museum hosts temporary exhibitions, and has hosted over 500 since its founding. Pitzen held her first exhibition in 1969, established a gallery in 1971, and later the "Circular" magazine with her husband.

Exhibitions
1991 Karl Ernst Osthaus-Museum, Hagen
1992 City Museum, Zwickau
1994 Städt. Gallery at the fish market, Erfurt
1998 City Museum Bonn
1999 Art Center, Ulaanbaatar
1999 Salzstadel of Regensburg
2001 Gallery Futura, Berlin
2001/02 art meeting digester, WWTW to Cologne
2008 MP 60, Bonn Women's Museum

Honors and awards
Federal Cross of Merit of the Federal Republic of Germany
1991 Woman of the Month, WDR 1

References

External links

Artists from Stuttgart
German women artists
Directors of museums in Germany
Women museum directors
Recipients of the Cross of the Order of Merit of the Federal Republic of Germany
1948 births
Living people